Radio Vikom is a Bosnian local commercial radio station, broadcasting from Gradiška/B. Gradiška, Bosnia and Herzegovina.

This radio station broadcasts folk or turbo-folk music and local news. The owner of the radio station is the company "VIKOM RTV" d.o.o., Gradiška na Savi which also operates RTV Vikom.

Program is mainly produced in Serbian language at one FM frequency (Kotor Varoš ) and it is available in the city of Banja Luka and Gradiška/Bosanska Gradiška as well as in nearby municipalities.

Estimated number of listeners of Radio Vikom is around 244.183.

The founder and director of the radio is Vinko Perić.

According to a 2006 media report, Radio Vikom was fined by Communications Regulatory Agency of Bosnia and Herzegovina for unauthorized use of frequencies in the Tuzla region. Also, in 2012, the largest fine for hate speech of 20,000 KM (BAM) was imposed on RTV Vikom.

Frequencies
 Kotor Varoš

See also 
 List of radio stations in Bosnia and Herzegovina
 Radio Gradiška
 Big Radio 3
 Radio Kozara
 PST Radio
 Plavi FM
 Radio UNO
 Radio Kontakt

References

External links 
 www.radiostanica.ba
 www.fmscan.org
 Communications Regulatory Agency of Bosnia and Herzegovina

Gradiška
Radio stations established in 1997
Mass media in Banja Luka